is a 2009 Japanese supernatural Action, Horror/Martial Arts, Vampires and Gore film, directed by Ten Shimoyama. And produced by Aya Pro Company, Rakuei-sha, There's Enterprise. Its original title is Buraddo.

Cast
 Aya Sugimoto as Miyako Rozmberk 
 Kanji Tsuda as Detective Hoshino
 Jun Kaname as Ukyo Kuronuma

References

External links
 

2009 action films
Films directed by Ten Shimoyama
Japanese supernatural horror films
Japanese action horror films
Supernatural action films
Japanese vampire films
2009 horror films
2009 films
2000s Japanese films